John Henry Baggott (20 July 1906 – 2 June 1995) was an Australian rules footballer who played and coached in the Victorian Football League (VFL) between 1927 and 1940 for the Richmond Football Club, Essendon Football Club, and South Melbourne Football Club.

Career in football
Baggott represented the Richmond Football Club between 1927 and 1935. He was Richmond's leading goal kicker in his debut year of 1927 with 37 goals, and again in 1928 with 61 goals. In Round 9 of the 1928 season he kicked a then club record 12 goals against South Melbourne, the first Richmond player to ever hit double figures in goal-kicking in a game. He placed third in the League's best and fairest award, the Brownlow Medal in that same year, and was also named in the Victorian state representative team in both 1928 and 1929. Baggot represented the club in several Grand Finals, including the 1932 and 1934 Premiership teams. By that stage Baggott was playing as an attacking half-back flanker, and was named in Richmond's best in both these Grand Final victories.

At the end of 1935 Baggott left Richmond to take on the role of captain-coach of the rival Essendon Football Club, starting in the 1936 season. He wound up his playing career during the 1937 season, at which point he handed over the captaincy to Keith Forbes, but continued coaching Essendon for several more seasons. An ongoing lack of success saw him replaced by legendary Essendon player and coach Dick Reynolds six games into the 1939 season. Baggott was then appointed as senior coach of the South Melbourne Football Club in 1940, but again achieved little success in with the Swans and was replaced at the end of that season.

Baggott later returned to Richmond and played a key role in forming the club's 'Former Players and Officials’ Association'. In 1960 he was made a life member of the Richmond Football Club. In 2019 Baggott was posthumously inducted into the Richmond 'Hall of Fame', with the award being accepted on his behalf by his nephew.

Personal life
Baggott was born in Pietermaritzburg, Natal (now South Africa) of Australian parents. The family returned to Australia while Baggott was a young boy.

He was the older brother of Ron Baggott who played for the Melbourne Football Club.

See also
 1927 Melbourne Carnival

Footnotes

References 
 Hogan P: The Tigers Of Old, Richmond FC, Melbourne 1996

External links

1906 births
1995 deaths
Richmond Football Club players
Richmond Football Club Premiership players
Essendon Football Club players
Essendon Football Club coaches
Sydney Swans coaches
Northcote Football Club players
Dimboola Football Club players
Australian rules footballers from Melbourne
VFL/AFL players born outside Australia
South African emigrants to Australia
Two-time VFL/AFL Premiership players